Ten nations competed in water polo at the 1956 Summer Olympics in Melbourne.

Medallists

Results
For the team rosters see: Water polo at the 1956 Summer Olympics – Men's team squads.

Preliminary round

The preliminary round consisted of a round-robin tournament held in three groups.  Each team played the other teams in its group once.

Group A

28 November
 14:00 - Romania def. Australia, 4-2
 19:30 - Yugoslavia def. Soviet Union, 3-2

29 November
 21:15 - Soviet Union def. Romania, 4-3
 22:15 - Yugoslavia def. Australia, 9-1

30 November
 10:30 - Yugoslavia def. Romania, 3-2
 16:00 - Soviet Union def. Australia, 3-0

Group B

28 November
 20:30 - United States def. Great Britain, 5-3

29 November
 15:45 - Hungary def. Great Britain, 6-1

30 November
 11:30 - Hungary def. United States, 6-2

Group C

28 November
 15:00 - Germany def. Singapore, 5-1

29 November
 16:45 - Italy def. Singapore, 7-1

30 November
 22:10 - Italy def. Germany, 4-2

Final round

The top two teams in each preliminary group advanced to the championship, in which they played each of the four other championship teams they had not previously faced.  The results of the preliminary round game against the team from their group carried over into the final round.

The teams that did not advance to the championship played in a consolation tournament.

Championship

The most famous water polo match in history was the semi-finals round match between Hungary and the Soviet Union. As the athletes left for the games, the Hungarian Revolution started and was crushed by the Soviet army. Many of the Hungarian athletes vowed never to return home and felt their only means of fighting back was in the pool.

With only two games left for each team, the Hungarians were leading in the standings, 1 point ahead of Yugoslavia and 2 ahead of the Soviets.  A Soviet victory would have put them alongside the Hungarians in the standings, with the final match pairings favoring the Soviets, who would face the last-place Germans while Hungary had to compete with Yugoslavia.  A Hungarian victory would ensure at least a silver medal for the team, with a draw or a win against Yugoslavia in the last game meaning gold.

The Hungary-Soviet Union confrontation was extremely bloody and violent, riddled with penalties, and the pool was later depicted as turning red from the blood spilt. The Hungarians led the Soviets 4-0 before the game was called off in the final minute to prevent angry spectators, many of them Hungarian immigrants to Australia, reacting to Valentin Prokopov punching Ervin Zádor's eye open. The Hungarians went on to win the gold medal by defeating Yugoslavia 2-1 in the final. Half of the Hungarian Olympic delegation defected after the Games.

1 December
 14:40 - Soviet Union def. Italy, 3-2
 22:40 - Yugoslavia def. United States, 5-1

3 December
 16:50 - United States def. Germany, 4-3
 21:30 - Hungary def. Italy, 4-0

4 December
 15:40 - Yugoslavia tied Germany, 2-2
 21:00 - Italy def. United States, 3-2

5 December
 16:40 - Soviet Union def. United States, 3-1
 22:20 - Hungary def. Germany, 4-0

6 December
 15:25 - Hungary def. Soviet Union, 4-0
 21:55 - Yugoslavia def. Italy, 2-1

7 December
 14:00 - Soviet Union def. Germany, 6-4
 21:20 - Hungary def. Yugoslavia, 2-1

Consolation

 Great Britain def. Singapore, 11-5
 Great Britain def. Australia, 5-2
 Romania def. Singapore, 15-1
 Great Britain def. Romania, 5-2
 Australia def. Singapore, 3-2
 Romania def. Australia, 4-2

See also 
 Blood in the Water match

References

Sources
 PDF documents in the LA84 Foundation Digital Library:
 Official Report of the 1956 Olympic Games (download, archive) (pp. 592–594, 624–627)
 Water polo on the Olympedia website
 Water polo at the 1956 Summer Olympics (men's tournament)
 Water polo on the Sports Reference website
 Water polo at the 1956 Summer Games (men's tournament) (archived)

External links
 International Olympic Committee medal database

 
1956 in water polo
1956 Summer Olympics events
1956
1956